Clemens Flämig (born in 1976) is a German conductor and Stadtsingechores zu Halle. In 2016, in the course of a selection procedure, he was shortlisted alongside  for the 17th Thomanerchor after Johann Sebastian Bach.

Life 
Flämig was born in Dresden in 1976 and was a member of the Dresdner Kreuzchor. For his further musical education he received a Rudolf Mauersberger scholarship in 1995.

Numerous master classes round off his musical education. In 2014 he took part in a further education master choir conducting course with Jörg-Peter Weigle in Berlin.

In addition to soloist tasks, Flämig sang in various professional vocal ensembles in Germany and Switzerland after his studies.

Flämig has worked as cantor and organist at the Georgskirche Denzlingen, the Auferstehungskirche Freiburg-Littenweiler and the Protestant district cantorate of Breisgau-Hochschwarzwald. From May 2011 to October 2014 Flämig was vice-conductor of the Knabenkantorei Basel. In 2013 he also took over several rehearsals with the Camerata Vocale Freiburg. Since 2014 he has regularly supervised performances of the J.S. Bach Foundation St. Gallen as choral assistant.

Flämig was nominated for the position of cantor of the Thomanerchor Leipzig in summer 2015. After rehearsing and performing sacred works for the motets and a Bach cantata with the boys' choir in rehearsal weeks, he was even a finalist in 2016 alongside Markus Teutschbein. Gotthold Schwarz, who had already conducted the St. Thomas Boys Choir on several occasions and had not applied for the Thomaskantorat, was, however, proposed to the Leipzig City Council on 23 May 2016 as the 17th Thomaskantor after Bach by the selection committee after the end of the selection process and was appointed to the post on 20 August 2016.

References

External links 
 
 Vier Kandidaten benannt für Kantorenamt des Thomanerchores; Article in the Neue Musikzeitung dated 21 August 2015
 Zweiter Kandidat fürs Thomaskantorat; Artikel der Leipziger Volkszeitung dated 15 January 2016
 Nur noch zwei Bewerber für Leitung des Thomanerchors; Artikel der Neuen Musikzeitung dated 19 April 2016
 Clemens Flämig und sein Stadtsingechor zu Halle in the Freiburger Pfarrkirche St. Johann; Artikel der Badischen Zeitung dated 17 June 2016

1976 births
Living people
Musicians from Dresden
German conductors (music)